Tiantaishan Wulong Temple (Simplified Chinese: 天台山伍龙寺) is a tourist attraction located near Anshun city in Pingba County of Guizhou Province, China. It is located close to the Tianlong Tunbao town. It is one of the Major National Historical and Cultural Sites of Guizhou. The combined hilltop fortress and Buddhist temple was built in the Ming Dynasty  and was once home to famous Ming general Wu Sangui.  Several relics of Wu Sangui are on display including his sword, robe, and water bucket. There is also an exhibit of costumes and photos from local Dixi Opera or "ground opera" performances.

References

Major National Historical and Cultural Sites in Guizhou
Buddhist temples in China
Religion in Guizhou